Argentina at the 1956 Summer Olympics in Melbourne, Australia and Stockholm, Sweden (equestrian events) was the nation's tenth appearance out of thirteen editions of the Summer Olympic Games. Argentina sent to the 1956 Summer Olympics its seventh national team, under the auspices of the Argentine Olympic Committee (Comité Olímpico Argentino), 28 athletes (27 men and the 1 woman), who competed in 27 events in 8 sports. They brought home 2 medals: 1 silver and 1 bronze. The Argentine flag bearer was Isabel Avellán, the nation's first female Olympic Games flag bearer.

Medalists

Athletics

Boxing

Fencing

One fencer represented Argentina in 1956.

Men's foil
 Santiago Massini

Men's épée
 Santiago Massini

Modern pentathlon

One male pentathlete represented Argentina in 1956.

 Luis Ribera

Sailing

Open

Shooting

Four shooters represented Argentina in 1956.

25 m pistol
 Oscar Cervo

50 m pistol
 Alberto Martijena

Trap
 Juan Gindre
 León Bozzi

Weightlifting

Wrestling

References

Nations at the 1956 Summer Olympics
1956
1956 in Argentine sport